Manpur Assembly constituency is one of the 230 Vidhan Sabha (Legislative Assembly) constituencies of Madhya Pradesh state in central India.

It is part of Umaria District.

See also
 Manpur, Umaria

References

Assembly constituencies of Madhya Pradesh